The New Oxford Review is a magazine of catholic cultural and theological commentary. It was founded in 1977 by the American Church Union as an Anglo-Catholic magazine in the Anglican tradition to replace American Church News. It was named for the Oxford Movement of the 1830s and 1840s. In 1983, it officially "converted" to Catholicism. 

During its earlier history, the championed Pope John Paul II's condemnation of the dissenting Catholic theologian Hans Küng. It supported Bernard Francis Law in his condemnation of the Catholic Common Ground Initiative.

Originally headquartered in Oakland, California, it is now headquartered in Berkeley, California. It has a paid circulation of 12,000. It has published writing by Walker Percy, Sheldon Vanauken, Thomas Howard, George A. Kelly, Bobby Jindal, Stanley L. Jaki, Peter Kreeft, Avery Dulles, Germain Grisez, James V. Schall, and John Lukacs. Contributing editors have included Robert N. Bellah, L. Brent Bozell Jr., Robert Coles, and Christopher Lasch.

References

Monthly magazines published in the United States
Anglican newspapers and magazines
Anglo-Catholicism
Catholic magazines
Magazines established in 1977
Magazines published in California
Mass media in Berkeley, California
Religious magazines published in the United States